Penguin Software was a computer software and video game publisher from Geneva, Illinois that produced graphics and application software and games for the Apple II, Macintosh, IBM, Commodore 64, Amiga, Atari 8-bit, and Atari ST computers. They produced the graphics programs Graphics Magician and Complete Graphics System, graphic adventure games such as the Transylvania series, arcade-style games like Spy's Demise, and role-playing video games such as Xyphus.

History 
The company was founded in 1978 by Mark Pelczarski as "MP Software" with its first product, a graphics program called Magic Paintbrush. It evolved to "Co-op Software" as part of a sister company, Micro Co-op, then adopted the name "Penguin Software" in 1981 when software publishing became the primary focus. Like many other home computer publishers at the time, Penguin Software openly credited the developers of their games on boxes and title screens; developers that were often not direct employees of Penguin Software but rather independent designers that were paid royalties by Penguin Software for the games that sold.

Penguin Software's core products were its graphics programs that were among the industry best-sellers of the early 1980s. The Complete Graphics System, first published in 1981, was a set of drawing and 3D graphics editing programs for the Apple II by founder Mark Pelczarski. Special Effects, co-written by Pelczarski and David Lubar later the same year, helped establish the company's slogan, "the graphics people". In early 1982, Pelczarski, Lubar, and Chris Jochumson created The Graphics Magician, which would define the next several years of the company's evolution. Graphics Magician was aimed toward developers or anyone wanting to be a developer, allowing any programmer to create animations for arcade-style games and compact graphic images for adventure games and educational software.

Developers began submitting their own creations written in part with Graphics Magician to Penguin Software for publication. Those that were accepted were polished and published and the authors were paid royalties on sales. These included the first two games published by Penguin Software, the animated game Pie Man by Eagle Berns and Michael Kosaka, and the adventure game Transylvania written by Antonia Antiochia. Many other publishers of software for the Apple II also licensed The Graphics Magician for their products, as there was no fee for the license; the only requirement was a credit line that Graphics Magician software was used in the product, which served as advertising for more sales of the Penguin Software graphics tools.

One of the other widely touted aspects of Penguin Software's titles was that they deliberately stopped using copy protection, thus making it easier to back up their programs.  Pelczarski sent a letter to many computer magazines to describe his position, which asked that users of their software not abuse their trust.

As software sales expanded into book stores, Penguin Software was confronted by Penguin Books in regard of infringement of their name. Fearing that the legal costs of a lawsuit could have decimated his company, even in the case of an eventual victory, Pelczarski phased in a new name "Polarware" in 1986, eventually ending the "Penguin Software" brand.

Since the Apple II, Macintosh, IBM, Commodore, and Atari computers all had varying graphics capabilities and different processors, releasing a software title for each different brand of computer usually involved programming it again from scratch for each platform. Penguin Software/Polarware began focusing on cross-platform ideas that would allow them to release games simultaneously on different systems without the lengthy re-programming process. The compact images from Graphics Magician could be used across platforms, and an adventure game development and deployment language called Comprehend was created to be system independent and was used for several releases. Also using Graphics Magician across platforms and with a portable design, the first three titles in the Adventures Around the World geography game series were released. However a similar idea called Where in the World is Carmen Sandiego reached the market a few months sooner and doomed the Penguin Software series.

In 1987 Polarware was purchased by four employees, Jeffrey (JJ) Jay, Steve Greene, Peg Smith, and Trish Glenn.  This new team produced the children's software series written by Brian A. Rice, The Electric Crayon, a simple electronic coloring book.  In 1988, Polarware was acquired by Merit Software and the Polarware name soon disappeared.

Legacy 
As Merit Software moved on to newer products, rights to the old software title were bought back from the remains of Polarware, and many of those titles were subsequently released as freeware to bring them out of Abandonware.

Also after end of official support of their products, an enthusiast reconstructed a source code variant of the Comprehend engine to port these games to modern platforms.

Software titles

References

General References
 
 
 
 
 
 

More Apple II games from Penguin Software from the Apple II World site (Japanese website, archived)

Defunct software companies of the United States
Defunct video game companies of the United States